Maxwell is a Scottish surname, a habitational name derived from a location near Melrose, in Roxburghshire, Scotland. This name was first recorded in 1144, as Mackeswell, meaning "Mack's spring (or stream)" (from the Old English well[a]). The surname Maxwell is also common in Ulster, where it has, in some cases, been adopted as alternate form of the surname Miskell. The surname Maxwell is represented in Scottish Gaelic as MacSuail.

People
Ally Maxwell (born 1965), Scottish football goalkeeper
Andrew Maxwell (born 1974), Irish stand-up comedian
Anna Maxwell (1851–1929), American nurse
Augustus Maxwell (1820–1903), American politician
Bernadine Maxwell (died 1988), All-American Girls Professional Baseball League player
Bill Maxwell (1882–1917), Australian rules footballer
Billy Maxwell (born 1929), American golfer
Brian Maxwell (1953–2004), Canadian athlete and founder of PowerBar
Brookie Maxwell (1956–2015), American artist
Bruce Maxwell (born 1990), American baseball player
Carmen Maxwell (1902–1987), American animator
Catherine Maxwell Stuart, 21st Lady of Traquair (born 1964), Scottish landowner and businesswoman
Cedric Maxwell (born 1955), American basketball player
Charles Maxwell (disambiguation), several people
Charlie Maxwell (born 1927), American baseball player
Chenoa Maxwell (born 1969), American actress and photographer
Col Maxwell (1917–2001), Australian rugby player
Colin Maxwell (politician) (born 1943), former politician in Saskatchewan, Canada
Constantia Maxwell (1886–1962), Irish historian
Corty Maxwell (1851–1925), American professional baseball umpire
David Maxwell (disambiguation), several people
Edward Maxwell (1867–1923), Canadian architect.
Edwin Maxwell (actor) (1886–1948), Irish actor
Edwin Maxwell, American lawyer, judge, and politician
Elsa Maxwell (1883–1963), American gossip columnist and socialite
Gavin Maxwell (1914–1969), Scottish naturalist
George Maxwell (disambiguation), several people
Gilbert Maxwell (1910–1979) American poet, actor, and author
Ghislaine Maxwell (born 1961), British sex offender and former socialite
Graham Maxwell, American theologian
Glenn Maxwell (born 1988), Australian cricketer 
Henry Maxwell, 7th Baron Farnham (1799–1868), Irish politician
Hugh Maxwell (1787–1873), New York County District Attorney and Collector of the Port of New York
Ian Maxwell (disambiguation), several people
Jackie Maxwell (born 1956), Canadian theatre director
James Maxwell (disambiguation), several people
Jan Maxwell (1956–2018), American actress
Jim Maxwell (commentator) (born 1950), Australian sports commentator
Jim Maxwell (American football) (born 1981), American football linebacker
Jimmy Maxwell (bandleader) (born 1953), musician and bandleader
Jimmy Maxwell (footballer) (1889–1916), Irish footballer
Jimmy Maxwell (trumpeter) (1917–2002), American trumpeter
John Maxwell (disambiguation), several people
Joseph Maxwell (disambiguation), several people
Justin Maxwell (born 1983), American baseball outfielder
Kenneth R. Maxwell (born 1941) British historian
Lilly Maxwell, the first woman to vote in Britain (1867)
Lois Maxwell (1927–2007), Canadian actress
Luke Maxwell, English footballer
Marcus Maxwell (born 1983), American football player
Marilyn Maxwell (1921–1972), American actress
Murray Maxwell (1775–1831), British Royal Navy officer
Neal A. Maxwell (1926–2004), American religious leader
Nicholas Maxwell (born 1937), philosopher at UCL
Paul Maxwell (1921–1991), Canadian actor working in Britain
Robert Maxwell (disambiguation), several people
Robin Maxwell (author) (born 1948), American writer
Ronald F. Maxwell (born 1947), American film director and writer
Russell Maxwell, American general
Scott Maxwell (born 1964), Canadian racing driver
Scott Maxwell (engineer) (born 1971), American engineer
Steamer Maxwell (1890–1975), Canadian ice hockey player
Stephen Maxwell (born 1940), Scottish nationalist
Stewart Maxwell (born 1963), Scottish politician
Tony Maxwell, American drummer and choreographer
Vernon Maxwell (born 1965), American basketball player
W. B. Maxwell (William Babington Maxwell, 1866–1938), British novelist
W. Henry Maxwell (1935–2010), American politician
William Maxwell (disambiguation), multiple people
Willie Maxwell, birth name of American rapper Fetty Wap

Fictional characters
Bob Maxwell (Coronation Street), fictional character in the British soap opera
Bobby Maxwell (character), fictional character from the 1976 American film The Enforcer
Duo Maxwell, in the anime Mobile Suit Gundam Wing
Enrico Maxwell, in the manga franchise Hellsing
Jane Maxwell, in the role-playing video game Wild Arms 3
Johnny Maxwell, fictional character in Terry Pratchett's novels
Nicole "Nikki" Maxwell, character in the Dork Diaries book series
Peter Maxwell, character in The Vampire Diaries
Peter Maxwell, in Clifford Simak's novel The Goblin Reservation

See also
Maxwell baronets, created in the Baronetage of Nova Scotia in 1627

References

English-language surnames
Surnames of Lowland Scottish origin
Surnames of Ulster-Scottish origin